Brasileosaurus (meaning "Brazil lizard") is a genus of notosuchid notosuchian from the Late Cretaceous Adamantina Formation of Brazil. The type species is B. pachecoi, discovered by the Brazilian Eng. Joviano Pacheco and described by the prolific German paleontologist Friedrich von Huene in 1931.

Brasileosaurus is not to be confused with the mesosaur Brazilosaurus.

Classification 
Although originally classified as a coelurosaur in the original description, it was later recognized as being a crocodylomorph, possibly synonymous with Uruguaysuchus. In his description of Sebecus, George Gaylord Simpson assigned Brasileosaurus to Notosuchidae, noting similarities with members of Mesoeucrocodylia.

References 

Prehistoric pseudosuchian genera
Maastrichtian life
Late Cretaceous crocodylomorphs of South America
Cretaceous Brazil
Fossils of Brazil
Adamantina Formation
Fossil taxa described in 1931
Taxa named by Friedrich von Huene